8-Bromoadenosine 3',5'-cyclic adenosine monophosphate (8-Br-cAMP) is a brominated derivative of cyclic adenosine monophosphate (cAMP). 8-Br-cAMP is an activator of cyclic AMP-dependent protein kinase, and it is long-acting because it is resistant to degradation by cyclic AMP phosphodiesterase.

See also
 8-Bromoguanosine 3',5'-cyclic monophosphate (8-Br-cGMP)

References

Nucleotides
Bromoarenes
Purines
Oxygen heterocycles
Phosphorus heterocycles